James McDonald,  (1 July 1828 – 3 October 1912) was a Canadian lawyer, politician, and judge.

He was born in Bridgeville, Nova Scotia, the son of Alexander McDonald and Janet Fraser. McDonald moved to London, Upper Canada in 1834 with his family but the family later returned to New Glasgow, Nova Scotia. McDonald studied law with Martin Isaac Wilkins and was called to the bar in 1851. In 1855, he married Jane Mortimer. He was elected to the Nova Scotia House of Assembly for Pictou County in 1859. McDonald was reelected in 1863 and was named chief railway commissioner. In 1864, he was named financial secretary and served in that post until 1867 when he was an unsuccessful candidate for a federal seat. In 1871, McDonald was again elected to the Nova Scotia assembly for Pictou County. McDonald was appointed by John A. Macdonald to the parliamentary committee to investigate allegations related to the Pacific Scandal in 1873. He resigned his seat after he was elected to the House of Commons in 1872. From 1878 to 1881, he was the Minister of Justice and Attorney General of Canada.

References

External links
Biography at the Dictionary of Canadian Biography Online

Canadian people of Scottish descent
Progressive Conservative Association of Nova Scotia MLAs
Conservative Party of Canada (1867–1942) MPs
Members of the House of Commons of Canada from Nova Scotia
Members of the King's Privy Council for Canada
People from Pictou County
Nova Scotia pre-Confederation MLAs
1828 births
1912 deaths